Bobby Lauher (1930–1973) was an American actor best known for his television skit work with Ernie Kovacs.  He was a co-author of a 1971 play in L.A. that brought back Patty Andrews (of the 1940s Andrews Sisters singing act), who, because of the play, began starring in Broadway musicals in NYC in the 1970s.

Acting career 
Bobby Lauher appeared as a skit actor in the Ernie Kovacs game show Take A Good Look (1959–1961), and acted in the film The Blue Knight (1973).

Playwright career 
Bobby Lauher was a collaborator with Milt Larsen on the book for the stage musical Victory Canteen, with songs by Richard M. Sherman and Robert B. Sherman (the songwriting Sherman Brothers team famous for their Mary Poppins songs), and starring Patty Andrews (of the 1940s Andrews Sisters).

Other credits 
Various other credits are:
 Writer/actor on the TV game show Truth or Consequences (1960–70)
 Writer/actor on Mickie Finn's TV show (1966) and stage show (1960–69)
 Writer for the comedy act Rowan & Martin.

Personal life 
Bobby Lauher was born August 30, 1930, in Illinois, USA, and died August 22, 1973, in Tarzana, Los Angeles County, California, USA.

References

External links 

1930 births
1973 deaths
20th-century American male actors